Halleloo-Y'-All is an album by American pianist, composer and bandleader Red Garland which was recorded in 1960 and released on the Prestige label.

Track listing
All compositions by Red Garland, except where noted.
 "Revelation Blues" – 6:11
 "I'll Never Be Free" (Bennie Benjamin, George David Weiss) – 11:06
 "Every Time I Feel the Spirit" (Traditional) – 4:48
 "Halleloo-Y'all" – 6:36
 "Back Slidin'" – 6:57

Personnel
Red Garland – piano, organ
Sam Jones – bass
Art Taylor – drums

References

1964 albums
Prestige Records albums
Red Garland albums
Albums recorded at Van Gelder Studio